Goodbye Falkenburg is the debut full-length album by the band Race Horses. It was released in 2010.

Track listing

2010 debut albums